The term neo-romanticism is used to cover a variety of movements in philosophy, literature, music, painting, and architecture, as well as social movements, that exist after and incorporate elements from the era of Romanticism.

It has been used with reference to late-19th-century composers such as Richard Wagner particularly by Carl Dahlhaus who describes his music as "a late flowering of romanticism in a positivist age". He regards it as synonymous with "the age of Wagner", from about 1850 until 1890—the start of the era of modernism, whose leading early representatives were Richard Strauss and Gustav Mahler . It has been applied to writers, painters, and composers who rejected, abandoned, or opposed realism, naturalism, or avant-garde modernism at various points in time from about 1840 down to the present.

Late 19th century and early 20th century 
Neo-romanticism as well as Romanticism is considered in opposition to naturalism—indeed, so far as music is concerned, naturalism is regarded as alien and even hostile . In the period following German unification in 1871, naturalism rejected Romantic literature as a misleading, idealistic distortion of reality. Naturalism in turn came to be regarded as incapable of filling the "void" of modern existence. Critics such as Hermann Bahr, Heinrich Mann, and Eugen Diederichs came to oppose naturalism and materialism under the banner of "neo-romanticism", demanding a cultural reorientation responding to "the soul’s longing for a meaning and  content in life" that might replace the fragmentations of modern knowledge with a holistic world view .

Late 20th century 
"Neo-romanticism" was proposed as an alternative label for the group of German composers identified with the short-lived Neue Einfachheit movement in the late 1970s and early 1980s. Along with other phrases such as "new tonality", this term has been criticised for lack of precision because of the diversity among these composers, whose leading member is Wolfgang Rihm .

Britain

1880–1910 
See:
 Lewis Carroll
 John Ruskin
 Edward Elgar
 Gerard Manley Hopkins
 Ralph Vaughan Williams
 The Aesthetic movement and the Arts & Crafts Movement
 Symbolism (arts)
 Rudyard Kipling
 A. E. Housman
 Neo-gothic architecture
 Some modes of pictorialism in photography.

1930–1955
In British art history, the term "neo-romanticism" is applied to a loosely affiliated school of landscape painting that emerged around 1930 and continued until the early 1950s. It was first labeled in March 1942 by the critic Raymond Mortimer in the New Statesman. These painters looked back to 19th-century artists such as William Blake and Samuel Palmer, but were also influenced by French cubist and post-cubist artists such as Pablo Picasso, André Masson, and Pavel Tchelitchew. This movement was motivated in part as a response to the threat of invasion during World War II. Artists particularly associated with the initiation of this movement included Paul Nash, John Piper, Henry Moore, Ivon Hitchens, and especially Graham Sutherland. A younger generation included John Minton, Michael Ayrton, John Craxton, Keith Vaughan, Robert Colquhoun, and Robert MacBryde .

Western Europe

The aesthetic philosophy of Arthur Schopenhauer and Friedrich Nietzsche has contributed greatly to neo-romantic thinking.

 Knut Hamsun (Norway)
 Sigurdur Nordal (Iceland)
 Anton Bruckner (Austria)
 Wandervogel (Germany)
 W.B. Yeats (Ireland)

Eastern Europe

 Alexander Kazbegi (Georgia)
 Uladzimir Karatkevich (Belarus)
 Johannes Semper (Estonia)
 Marie Under (Estonia)
 Odysseus Elytis (Greece)
 Young Poland Movement (Poland)
 Antoni Lange (Poland)
 Stanisław Przybyszewski (Poland/Germany)
 Tadeusz Miciński (Poland)
 Karol Szymanowski (Poland)
 Eugene Berman (Russia)
 Pavel Tchelitchew (Russia)
 Dragotin Kette (Slovenia)
 Vladimir Nabokov (Russia), in particular his 1932 novel  Glory

India

The Chhayavaad movement in Indian literature

United States

 Justine Kurland's photography
 Edgar Allan Poe, a writer, poet, editor, and literary critic. 
 Donna Tartt, in particular her popular debut novel The Secret History

Japan
Beginning in the mid-1930s and continuing through World War II, a Japanese neo-romantic literary movement was led by the writer Yasuda Yojūrō .

In popular culture

See also
 Romantic music
 Guild socialism
 Utopian socialism
 Wandervogel
 Robert Baden-Powell
 Metamodernism

Modern manifestations
 Fantasy art
 Goth subculture
 Regionalism (art)
 Neopagan
 Neofolk
 Neoromanticism (music)
 Neotribalism
 New Romantic

References

Further reading

British:

 
 
 
 
 
 
 
 
 
 
 
 
 
 

Indian
 .

External links
EBNR: An Encyclopedia of British Neoromanticism

 
Art movements
Literary movements
Modern art